FC Samegrelo is a Georgian football club based in the town of Chkhorotsku. Following the 2022 season, the club was relegated to Regionuli Liga, the fifth tier of Georgian league system. 

The team plays their home matches at Bondo Papaskiri central Stadium.

History

Founded in 1980, the club has not participated in the Georgian top flight. 

In unique circumstances Samegrelo once took part in Pirveli Liga. In the middle of the 2014-15 season they replaced Sasco, who had withdrawn from the competition due to financial troubles. As the team failed to stay up in the league, though, they spent the next three years in the third tier.

Samegrelo won C Group of Meore Liga in 2016. However, not a single team gained promotion in this transitional season.

According to existing regulations in 2018, despite coming 11th among 20 league teams, Samegrelo dropped down to Liga 4, where they remained for four seasons. 
  
Starting from 2020, Samegrelo battled against a further relegation. In the first year, they avoided this fate only after the league was subjected to the reorganization, which included the increase of teams from 16 to twenty.  
 
In the next year the club initially performed so poorly that they seemed hopeless in their survival battle. However, having won seven matches in Relegation Round with a large margin, Samegrelo under head coach Paata Bukia comfortably finished in the fourth place. 

But in 2022, they ended up in the relegation zone and joined other three sides bound for Regionuli Liga.

Recent seasons

Honours
Meore Liga 

Winners (1): 2016 (Group C, West)

Name
Samegrelo is a Georgian name for the region where Chkhorotsku is situated.

External links
On Soccerway

Facebook page

References

Football clubs in Georgia (country)